Ye Olde Man & Scythe is a public house on Churchgate in Bolton, England. The earliest recorded mention of its name is in a charter from 1251, making it one of the ten oldest public houses in Britain and the oldest in Bolton. The present form of the name, prefixed with "Ye Olde", is a pseudoarchaism derived from the Man and Scythe Inn; it derives from the crest of the Pilkington family, which consists of a reaper using a scythe, alluding to a tradition about one of the early members of the family.

History

It is not known exactly when Ye Olde Man & Scythe was originally built, but a charter of 1251 permitting the market mentions it by name. It has been rebuilt at least once (1636 according to the datestone inside), and only the vaulted cellar remains of the original structure, though some internal beams remain from 1636. The frontage of the building is an early 20th-century remodelling. It is a Grade II listed building.

In 1651 the Earl of Derby was executed outside the Man & Scythe – owned at the time by his family – for his part in the Bolton Massacre. Outside is a cross on the site with a plaque that relates the story of Bolton through the ages. The pub contains a chair that the Earl of Derby supposedly sat on before being taken outside to be beheaded; its inscription reads "15th October 1651 In this chair James 7th Earl of Derby sat at the Man and Scythe Inn, Churchgate, Bolton immediately prior to his execution".

Architecture
The inn has a timber frame and slate roof. The building, occupied by a public house and shop, has a four-window range each end of which is gabled. The two-storey public house occupies the central range and the right-hand gable, which has canted bay windows on each floor. There is a round-arched doorway into the public house and a three-light window to its left. On the first floor are two casement windows. The ground floor window frames and leaded windows date from the early 20th century; the doorway is older. The entry to the yard separates the pub and shop. The shop front in the left-hand gable has a doorway next to a canted oriel window and a two-light mullioned and transomed window above it. The shop front appears to date from the early 19th century.

References

External links
 

Buildings and structures in Bolton
Grade II listed pubs in Greater Manchester
History of Bolton
Timber framed buildings in England
Grade II listed buildings in the Metropolitan Borough of Bolton